Ọba Sikiru Kayọde Adetọna (born 10 May 1934) is the Awùjalẹ̀ of the Ijẹbu Kingdom, a traditional state in Nigeria.  He was installed as the king on 2 April 1960, which makes him one of the longest reigning monarchs in Nigeria. He is a member of the House of Anikinaiya.

Early life
Ọba Sikiru Olukayọde Adetọna, Ọgbagba Agbotewole II, was born on 10 May 1934, into the Royal House of Anikinaiya of Ijẹbuland in his father's house in Imupa, Ijebu Ode. His father Prince Rufai Adetọna Adeleke (born ), a son of Ọba Adeleke, Ọgbagba Agbotewole I (c. 1825–1906), the Awujalẹ of Ijẹbuland from 1895 to 1906. His mother was Ajibabi Ọnaṣile, who was from the town of Ijebu Igbo. The founder of the Royal House of Anikinaiya (or Anikilaya) was his great-grandfather Oba Anikilaya, Figbajoye Agboogunsa I, (c. 1775–1854) who reigned from 1821 to 1854, and who himself was a son of Ọba Gbelegbuwa. As a member of the Royal House of Anikinaiya, his paternal family claimed descent from Olu-Iwa, the semi-legendary first Awujalẹ and Ọbanta, another founder of the Ijẹbu kingdom.

Education
Prince Adetọna attended various Baptist Schools, Ereko, Ijẹbu-Ode; Ogbere United Primary School, Oke Agbo, Ijẹbu-Igbo; and Ansar-Ud-Deen School, Ijebu-Ode between 1943 and 1950. For his secondary education, he attended Olu-Iwa (now Adeola Odutọla) College, Ijebu-Ode from 1951 to 1956. Between 1957 and 1958 he took up an appointment with the then Audit Department of the Western Region, Ibadan.

The prince resigned his appointment in 1958 to pursue further studies in accountancy in the United Kingdom, which was the colonial ruler of Nigeria at the time.

Rise to the Throne
By a letter dated 4 January 1960, referenced CB. 4 1/333, the Permanent Secretary in the Western Region Ministry of Local Government conveyed to the Local Government Adviser in Ijẹbu Ode approval of the Western Region Governor in Council, the appointment of Prince Sikiru Kayode Adetona as king, and his confirmation as the new Awujale of Ijebuland with effect from that date (January 4, 1960). It became the lot of Ijẹbu notables like the late Ọgbẹni-Ọja, Chief (Dr.) Timothy Adeọla Odutọla, Bọbasuwa I, Chief Emmanuel Okusanya Okunọwọ (MBE, KFNM); and Aṣiwaju, Chief Samuel Ọlatubọsun Ṣhonibare to arrange for the home-coming of the King-elect. On January 18, 1960, the Head of the Ijẹbu Ode Regency Council, the Ọgbeni-Ọja, Chief Timothy Adeọla Odutọla formally presented the new traditional ruler to the whole world. This presentation, which was a novelty, signalled the commencement of the installation ceremonies of the king-elect. It was indeed, a new dawn in the annals of Ijẹbu people. The king-elect thereafter proceeded to undergo the traditional seclusion at the Odo for three months.

Oba Sikiru Kayọde Adetọna, who had earlier been nominated along with five others by the ODIS was unanimously selected by the kingmakers in conformity with Section 11 of the Chiefs Law of 1957 applicable in Western Region. The then Governor signed the Instrument of Office approving Prince Sikiru Kayọde Adetọna as Awujalẹ of Ijẹbuland. The formal coronation took place on Saturday, April 2, 1960.

On 5 April 1960, newly crowned Ọba Adetọna took his seat as a member of the Western Region House of Chiefs, after a formal introduction. Ọba Sikiru Kayọde Adetọna was a charismatic Prince, and some Ọbas and Chiefs nominated him for the presidency of the House of Chiefs. Albeit, an older and traditionally more senior Ọba, late Sir Adesọji Aderẹmi, Ọni of Ifẹ was subsequently elected the President. The thought here was that early as a monarch, the twenty-six-year-old Awujalẹ was a fit and proper king for the exalted position. No doubt, this consideration was an admission of the uniqueness of the Awujalẹ of Ijẹbuland.

See also
Ijẹbu Kingdom
Nigerian traditional rulers

References

1934 births
Living people
Yoruba monarchs
People from Ogun State
Nigerian royalty